Myer Creek is a stream in the U.S. state of Oregon. It is a tributary to the Bear Creek.

Myer Creek was named in the 1850s after one Nathaniel Myer.

References

Rivers of Oregon
Rivers of Jackson County, Oregon